Okanogan County is a county located in the U.S. state of Washington along the Canada–U.S. border. As of the 2020 census, the population was 42,104. The county seat is Okanogan, while the largest city is Omak. Its area is the largest in the state.

About a fifth of the county's residents live in the Greater Omak Area. The county forms a portion of the Okanogan Country. The first county seat was Ruby, which has now been a ghost town for more than 100 years.

Okanogan County was formed out of Stevens County in February 1888. The name derives from the Okanagan language place name ukʷnaqín. The name Okanogan (Okanagan) also refers to a part of southern British Columbia.

History
Before Europeans arrived, the Okanogan County region was home to numerous indigenous peoples that would eventually become part of three Indian reservations referred to as the Northern Okanogans or Sinkaietk, Tokoratums, Kartars and Konkonelps. They spoke in seven types of Interior Salish languages related to the Puget Sound tribes. The Okanogans experienced a favorable climate, camping in the winter, hunting bears in the spring, catching fish in the summer and hunting deer in fall. The camps consisted of teepee-like longhouses built with hides and bark. Women gathered nuts and berries.

Due to its remoteness, the Okanogan County area was one of the last in Washington settled by Europeans. It was an early thoroughfare used by prospectors to gain access to other communities, such as British Columbia. By the 21st century, the region specialized in agriculture, forestry and tourism. Electric producer Grand Coulee Dam was constructed between 1933 and 1942, originally with two power plants, around the Okanogan and Grant counties at the former's southern border.

It destroyed over 300 homes including 100 in and around Pateros

Geography

It is the largest county in the state by area, and it is larger than three states in land area.

Geographic features
Cascade Mountains
Columbia River
Okanogan River
North Gardner Mountain, the highest point in Okanogan County
Beaner Lake

Major highways
 U.S. Route 97
 State Route 20
 State Route 153

Adjacent counties

Fraser Valley Regional District, British Columbia – northwest
Okanagan-Similkameen Regional District, British Columbia – north
Kootenay Boundary Regional District, British Columbia – northeast
Ferry County – east
Lincoln County – southeast
Grant County – south
Douglas County – south
Chelan County – southwest
Skagit County – west
Whatcom County – west

National protected areas
 Pacific Northwest National Scenic Trail (part)
 Nez Perce National Historical Park (part)
 Okanogan–Wenatchee National Forest
 Pasayten Wilderness

Demographics

2000 census
As of the census of 2000, there were 39,564 people, 15,027 households, and 10,579 families living in the county. The population density was 8 people per square mile (3/km2). There were 19,085 housing units at an average density of 4 per square mile (1/km2). The racial makeup of the county was 75.32% White, 0.28% Black or African American, 11.47% Native American, 0.44% Asian, 0.07% Pacific Islander, 9.58% from other races, and 2.84% from two or more races. 14.38% of the population were Hispanic or Latino of any race. 14.0% were of German, 9.5% English, 9.2% United States or American and 6.8% Irish ancestry.

There were 15,027 households, out of which 33.20% had children under the age of 18 living with them, 54.40% were married couples living together, 11.00% had a female householder with no husband present, and 29.60% were non-families. 24.50% of all households were made up of individuals, and 9.70% had someone living alone who was 65 years of age or older. The average household size was 2.58 and the average family size was 3.04.

In the county, the population was spread out, with 27.70% under the age of 18, 7.30% from 18 to 24, 25.50% from 25 to 44, 25.50% from 45 to 64, and 14.00% who were 65 years of age or older. The median age was 38 years. For every 100 females there were 99.20 males. For every 100 females age 18 and over, there were 98.00 males.

The median income for a household in the county was $29,726, and the median income for a family was $35,012. Males had a median income of $29,495 versus $22,005 for females. The per capita income for the county was $14,900.  About 16.00% of families and 21.30% of the population were below the poverty line, including 28.20% of those under age 18 and 10.40% of those age 65 or over.

2010 census
As of the 2010 census, there were 41,120 people, 16,519 households, and 10,914 families living in the county. The racial makeup of the county was 73.9% white, 11.4% American Indian, 0.6% Asian, 0.4% black or African American, 0.1% Pacific islander, 10.1% from other races, and 3.5% from two or more races. Those of Hispanic or Latino origin made up 17.6% of the population. In terms of ancestry, 21.4% were German, 12.4% were Irish, 12.2% were English, and 3.6% were American.

Of the 16,519 households, 29.4% had children under the age of 18 living with them, 49.7% were married couples living together, 10.7% had a female householder with no husband present, 33.9% were non-families, and 28.0% of all households were made up of individuals. The average household size was 2.45 and the average family size was 2.96. The median age was 42.9 years.

The median income for a household in the county was $38,551 and the median income for a family was $48,418. Males had a median income of $37,960 versus $29,032 for females. The per capita income for the county was $20,093. About 14.7% of families and 19.5% of the population were below the poverty line, including 27.3% of those under age 18 and 9.2% of those age 65 or over.

Communities

Cities
Brewster
Okanogan (county seat)
Omak
Oroville
Pateros
Tonasket

Towns
Conconully
Coulee Dam (partial)
Elmer City
Nespelem
Riverside
Twisp
Winthrop

Census-designated places
Disautel
Loomis
Malott
Methow
Nespelem Community
North Omak

Other unincorporated communities

Aeneas
Azwell
Carlton
Ellisford (aka Ellisforde)
Havillah
Mazama
Monse
Nighthawk
Rocky Butte
Synarep
Wauconda

Ghost towns
Bodie
Bolster
Chesaw
Molson
Ruby

Politics

See also
National Register of Historic Places listings in Okanogan County, Washington
Okanogan Conservation District

Further reading
Available online through the Washington State Library's Classics in Washington History collection

References

 
1888 establishments in Washington Territory
Populated places established in 1888
Eastern Washington
Washington placenames of Native American origin